Awaous tajasica, the sand fish or sandfish, is a species of goby native to fresh and brackish waters of Brazil in South America with reports outside of Brazil considered to be questionable.  This species can reach a length of  SL.

References

External links
 Photograph

tajasica
Fish of South America
Fish described in 1822